Vineetha is a former Indian actress, who appeared predominantly in Tamil films and Malayalam films. She has also acted in some Kannada, Telugu and Hindi films. She made her debut through the Tamil film Chinna Jameen (1993).

Career
The actress was arrested in 2003 on suspicion of prostitution but was later cleared in 2004 with no charges, with Vineetha stating the trial had put her through mental agony and she added that the police had filed a false case against her to malign her name in the society. After taking a break from the industry for eight years, she returned in 2008 to play a supporting role in the low-budget drama Enga Raasi Nalla Raasi. She has acted in over 70 films in most of the major Indian languages.

Notable filmography

References

External links
 

Actresses from Tamil Nadu
Indian film actresses
Living people
Actresses in Malayalam cinema
Actresses in Tamil cinema
Actresses in Telugu cinema
Place of birth missing (living people)
Actresses in Hindi cinema
20th-century Indian actresses
21st-century Indian actresses
Actresses in Kannada cinema
1978 births